Yokokura Station is the name of two train stations in Japan.

 Yokokura Station (Miyagi) - (横倉駅) in Miyagi Prefecture
 Yokokura Station (Nagano) - (横倉駅) in Nagano Prefecture